Tryggve Fossum is a Norwegian computer architect at Intel. He transferred there from DEC, where he was a lead architect of Alpha processors, after working on several VAX processors.

References

Year of birth missing (living people)
Living people
Computer hardware engineers
Digital Equipment Corporation people
Intel people
Norwegian engineers